Uranus Pathfinder was a mission concept for the Uranian system evaluated in the 2010s by the European Space Agency. In 2011, scientists from the Mullard Space Science Laboratory in the United Kingdom proposed the joint NASA–ESA Uranus Pathfinder mission to Uranus. It would have been a medium-class (M-class) mission to be launched in 2022, and was submitted to the ESA in December 2010 with the signatures of 120 scientists from around the globe. ESA caps the cost of M-class missions at €470 million. Uranus Pathfinder was proposed in support of ESA's Cosmic Vision 2015–2025. The mission study including several possible combinations of launch dates, trajectories, and flybys (gravity assists), including flybys of Earth, Venus, and of the planet Saturn. Indeed, the study noted the velocity change requirements are only marginally higher than for typical missions to Saturn of this period.

In the baseline concept, UP is an ESA–NASA bilateral mission and it would launch on an Atlas V 551 in January 2025 on an Venus–Earth–Earth interplanetary transfer to Uranus, reaching Uranus orbit in November 2037 after a cruise phase lasting 12.8 years.

It would orbit Uranus in a highly eccentric 45-day polar science orbit, with close periapsis distances to Uranus to make high fidelity measurements of Uranus's gravitational and magnetic fields.

The scientific payload has a strong heritage in Europe and beyond and includes: narrow angle camera, visible/near-IR imaging spectrometer, thermal IR bolometer, radio science, magnetometer, radio and plasma wave detector, and plasma detector.

The mission would use the Earth communication stations at New Norcia (X band), and Cebreros (X and Ka bands) during its long cruise to the Uranian system.

Possible flyby/gravity assist combinations studied:

VVE (Venus–Venus–Earth)
VEE
EVVE
VEES (Venus–Earth–Earth–Saturn)
VVEES

For power, the proposal suggests using a European radioisotope thermoelectric generator based on americium-241, with NASA's MMRTG and ASRG mentioned as possible backup options, which would provide more power.

See also
Atmosphere of Uranus
Exploration of Uranus
Moons of Uranus
Uranus mission proposals
 MUSE
 Oceanus
 ODINUS
 Uranus orbiter and probe

References

External links
Uranus Pathfinder

Proposed NASA space probes
Missions to Uranus
European Space Agency space probes
Orbiters (space probe)